In mathematics, a Hasse–Schmidt derivation is an extension of the notion of a derivation.

Definition

For a (not necessarily commutative nor associative) ring B and a B-algebra A, a Hasse–Schmidt derivation is a map of B-algebras

is a Hasse–Schmidt derivation, as follows from applying the Leibniz rule iteratedly.

Equivalent characterizations

 shows that a Hasse–Schmidt derivation is equivalent to an action of the bialgebra

Applications

Basic properties of derivations in this context lead to a conceptual proof of the Cayley–Hamilton theorem. See also .

References
 
 
 
 

Abstract algebra